Charles Reid (20 September 1837 – 1929) was one of the first and most successful commercial photographers in Scotland.  He pioneered the photography of livestock and wildlife in an era when very long exposures were generally required. In a 50-year career, he travelled all over the UK.

Reid was born in Turriff, Aberdeenshire, Scotland, the son of William Reid,  a plasterer and labourer, and Isabella Findlater. Reid married and had seven children.
Reid began work as a cattle herds boy at the age of 10. An apprenticeship to a shoemaker followed and then work as a post runner. The gift of a camera from a lodger started him on the career that would occupy the remainder of his days. The local trade directory indicates that Reid had a studio in Turriff until around 1876, after which he settled in Wishaw and set up a studio in Shand Street.

He travelled the length and breadth of Britain photographing the prize race horses and breeding stock of the landed gentry. For many years he was the official photographer to the Highland an Agricultural Society of Scotland and to the Royal Agricultural Society of England.

Ian Sumner in The Encyclopedia of 19th Century Photography, 2013 said of Reid "Reid's pictures are always well composed and show good technique and many examples of his small studies were purchased by artists as reference for their paintings and sculptures".
Reid produced a large quantity of high-quality albumen and carbon prints. His large carbon studies of Highland cattle and sheep graced many late Victorian parlours. Reid also ran a photographic studio in Wishaw that produced portraits  and cabinet cards typical of the period.

Gallery

Publications
 Reid, Charles, Animal Studies (Photographs From Life). Charles Letts & Company 1902
 Reid Charles, Bird Life Containing Over One Hundred Illustrations of Birds and Their Nests from Photographs. T. N. Foulis, 1914
 Scottish Country Life magazine of 1915, pages 189–190, "A Master of Photography : Charles Reid, Wishaw" (article)

References

External links 
 
 Catalogue description 'Photograph. Group of eleven bull dogs'.  Copyright owner of work: Charles Reid,...
 A portrait of Alexander Ayton that appeared in The Practical Photographer beside his death notice in January 1895

1837 births
1929 deaths
Scottish photographers
People from Turriff